Diamond High School is a high school located in Diamond, Missouri and is part of the Diamond R-IV Schools.  The mascot is the Wildcat and its colors are black and gold.

References

External links
 Diamond H.S.

Public high schools in Missouri
Schools in Newton County, Missouri